Anna Avanzini (19 November 1917 – 24 January 2011) was an Italian gymnast. She competed in the women's artistic team all-around event at the 1936 Summer Olympics.

References

External links
 

1917 births
2011 deaths
Italian female artistic gymnasts
Olympic gymnasts of Italy
Gymnasts at the 1936 Summer Olympics
People from Busto Arsizio
Sportspeople from the Province of Varese